The F124 Sachsen class is the German Navy's latest class of highly advanced air-defense frigates. The design of the Sachsen-class frigate is based on that of the F123  but with enhanced stealth features designed to deceive an opponent's radar and acoustic sensors.  The class incorporates an advanced multifunction radar APAR and a SMART-L long-range radar which is purported to be capable of detecting stealth aircraft and stealth missiles.

Although designated as frigates, they are comparable to destroyers in capability and were intended to replace the Navy's . They are similar to the Dutch , in that both are based on the use of a common primary anti-air warfare system built around the APAR and SMART-L radars as well as the area-defence SM-2 Block IIIA and point-defence Evolved Sea Sparrow Missile (ESSM) surface-to-air missiles.

The German government contracted for three ships in June 1996 with an option on a fourth that was provisionally to have been named Thüringen, but the option for this fourth ship was not taken up. At €2.1 billion for the three ships, the class was one of the most expensive ship building programs of the German Navy.

Design
Following the reunification of Germany in 1990 at the end of the Cold War, the German Navy continued the construction program of the former Bundesmarine (Federal Navy), which projected a fleet centered on destroyers and frigates. The Sachsen class was the second group of frigates to be built in the post-unification era, following the s laid down in the early 1990s. The three Sachsens were ordered to replace the old s that were then over thirty years old.

General characteristics and machinery

They displace  at full load. The frigates have a crew of 38 officers, 64 petty officers, and 140 enlisted sailors. They have accommodations for an additional thirteen officers and sailors as part of a squadron commander's staff, and they have crew provisions for female sailors. The ships can remain at sea for 21 days at a time.

The ships' hulls were designed on the pattern of the previous Brandenburg class to allow for great commonality of parts to reduce maintenance costs; they were built using MEKO modular construction and incorporate seven watertight compartments. The primary improvement over the earlier vessels is the significantly reduced radar signature. The ships were designed with a capacity for an extra  of weight, to allow for future additions of new weapons and sensors without compromising the ships' efficiency.

The ships of the Sachsen class are equipped with a combined diesel and gas (CODAG) propulsion system. The two operating shafts work independently. The diesel engines are installed in a non-walkable sound-proof capsule. The shafts drive two five-bladed variable-pitch propellers. The ships are equipped with four 1,000 kilowatt diesel generators that operate at 400 Volts (V) and 115 V.

Steering is controlled via the Rudder Roll System, which communicates information about the ship's position and rudder dampening signals, allowing the ships to maintain "almost unprecedented stability" in as high as sea state 5.

Armament

These ships were optimized for the anti-air warfare role. The primary anti-air weapons are the 32-cell Mk 41 Mod 10 vertical launching system, equipped with twenty-four SM-2 Block IIIA missiles and thirty-two Evolved Sea Sparrow missiles. Point-defense against cruise missiles is provided by a pair of 21-round Rolling Airframe Missile launchers. The ships are also equipped with two four-cell RGM-84 Harpoon anti-ship missile launchers. In 2013, the German Navy considered modifying the ships' long-range search radar to allow the SM-2 missiles to be used in an anti-ballistic missile capacity.

For defense against submarines, the frigates carry two triple-launchers for the  MU90 Impact torpedoes. The ships also carry a variety of guns, including one dual-purpose 62-caliber  gun manufactured by OTO Melara. They are also armed with two Rheinmetall  MLG 27 remote-controlled autocannons in single mounts.

In January 2003, Hamburg had a modified Panzerhaubitze 2000 turret with a  gun fitted experimentally for the Modular Naval Artillery Concept. The experiment was a feasibility study for the projected F125-class frigate.

Sachsen and her sister ships are equipped with a flight deck and hangar that can accommodate two Super Lynx or NH90 helicopters. The flight deck is rated to accommodate a  helicopter in conditions up to sea state 6. The helicopter handling system from MBB-Förder und Hebesysteme uses laser guided and computer controlled manipulator arms to secure the helicopter after landing.

Sensors and countermeasures

For this role the ships are equipped with an advanced sensor and weapons suite. The primary sensors for this role are the long range surveillance radar SMART-L and the multi-function radar APAR. The SMART-L and APAR sets are highly complementary, in the sense that SMART-L is an L band radar providing very long range surveillance while APAR is an X band radar providing precise target tracking, a highly capable horizon search capability, and missile guidance using the Interrupted Continuous Wave Illumination (ICWI) technique, thus allowing guidance of 32 semi-active radar homing missiles in flight simultaneously, including 16 in the terminal guidance phase. The ships are also equipped with two STN Atlas 9600-M ARPA navigation radars.

Modernisation efforts 
In 2013, Atlas Elektronik and Thales Deutschland were awarded a contract to modernize the frigates command system, with the project to be completed by 2017.

In August 2021, the German armed forces' procurement agency (BAAINBw) awarded a contract to German and Israeli companies Hensoldt and IAI, under which the Sachsen-class frigates will have their obsolete SMART-L long-range radar replaced by a new AESA radar system designated as TRS-4D/LR ROT. It will be capable of tracking "very small and maneuverable" targets at distances of more than 400 km for air targets and up to 2,000 km for targets in earth orbit. This includes long-range ballistic missiles, allowing Germany to participate in NATOs BMD (ballistic missile defence) efforts. It is not planned to fit an anti-ballistic missile such as the SM-3 to the ships. The ships IFF systems will also be modernised.

Before installation of the three shipborne radars commences, an additional first unit will in 2023 be installed at a coastal facility near the Naval School of Technology at Parow in the state of Mecklenburg-Western Pomerania for purposes of training and evaluation. The first ship is planned to have its radar installed in 2024 and all three ships are to have been fitted with the new system by 2028. 

The same Hensoldt/IAI system has also been selected by the German Air Force in order to replace its stationary HR-3000 - or HADR (Hughes Air Defense Radar) - early warning radars.

Ships

Service history

In August 2004, Sachsen completed a series of live missile firings at the Point Mugu missile launch range off the coast of California that included a total of 11 ESSM and 10 SM-2 Block IIIA missiles. The tests included firings against target drones such as the BQM-74E Chukar III and BQM-34S Firebee I, as well as against missile targets such as the AQM-37C Jayhawk and air-launched Kormoran 1 anti-ship missiles. While serving in NATO Standing Maritime Force 1 in 2004, Sachsen took part in training operations with the United States' aircraft carrier . The seven frigates together form the 2nd  (Frigate Squadron).

Operations with American carrier groups continued through the 2000s and 2010s, including inter-operability exercises with Hessen and the carrier  in 2010. Hessen thereafter departed for a cruise in the Mediterranean Sea. In addition, Hamburg became the first German ship to fully integrate into an American carrier strike group in March 2013.

Hessen served as the flagship of the NATO Standing Maritime Force 1 in January 2013. In March 2015, Hessen and the frigates  and  took part in Operation Good Hope, a training exercise conducted with the South African Navy.

Exports
Rumors emerged in July 2013 that the Israeli Navy had agreed to procure two destroyers from Germany for €1 billion. These had been rumored to be Sachsen-class vessels. Eventually, Israel purchased four s—significantly smaller vessels—from German shipyards in 2015.

See also 
 List of naval ship classes in service

Similar ships
 , The Netherlands
 , Spain
 FREMM multipurpose frigate, French/Italian collaboration
 , Norway
 , Denmark
 Type 26 frigate, an equivalent British design

Footnotes

References

External links 

 Fregatte SACHSEN-Klasse (in German) - @ Marine (official homepage of the German Navy)
 Fregatte "Sachsen" (F124) (in German) @ hansa-online.de

 
 
Stealth ships